Berechiah de Nicole also known as Benedict fil Mosse, (d. after 1270), was a thirteenth-century English Tosafist who lived at Lincoln.

Biography
He was born in the first quarter of the 13th century.
He was of the well-known Hagin family, and son of Rabbi Moses ben Yom-Tov of London. He was the chief rabbi of Lincoln (the Norman-French name of which was "Nicole"), and probably lived in the house now known as the Jew's House in that city; for this was in the possession of a certain Belaset of Wallington in 1287, and there is a deed which speaks of Belaset, daughter of the Rav Berechiah. It has been conjectured that it was to attend the marriage of this Belaset and to do Berechiah honour that the Jews of England assembled at Lincoln toward the end of August 1255, when the body of Little Saint Hugh of Lincoln was discovered, and all the Lincoln Jews were sent up to London for complicity in a so-called ritual murder. Berechiah was released earlier than the rest of the Jews, on 7 January 1256.

His subsequent fate is unknown; but there are a number of decisions of his in the ritual literature of the time, which show that he was considered an authority in ritual matters. For instance, the Mordechai quotes that he decided that the evening prayer might be said an hour and a quarter before the legal time of night.

Sources

 Jewish Encyclopedia bibliography: Zunz, Z. G. p. 97; Renan-Neubauer, Les Rabbins Français, p. 441; Jacobs, in Trans. Jew. Hist. Soc. England, i. 102–111.G. J.

Bibliography
Roth, C. ‘Rabbi Berechiah of Nicole (Benedict of Lincoln) Journal of Jewish Studies I ii (1948-9) 67–81.

Tosafists
13th-century English rabbis
People from Lincoln, England
Chief rabbis of cities